Ryan Cranston is a professional lacrosse player and advocate for cancer patients. A native of West Chester, Pennsylvania, Cranston attended B. Reed Henderson High School. He later attended Lynchburg College, where he was a four-year stand out lacrosse player and a 3-x Division 3 lacrosse all-American. In 2008, after graduating from college, Cranston was drafted in the 4th round of the MLL draft by the San Francisco Dragons. Later he joined the LXM pro tour. Using his lacrosse pedigree, Cranston is the creator and founder of the lacrosse tournament "Care 4 the Cure", in which all proceeds go to the fight against leukemia and lymphoma.

College career

Ryan Cranston attended Lynchburg College, located in Lynchburg, Virginia where he graduated in 2008. While attending there he helped lead the Hornets to two ODAC lacrosse championships (2005, 2008) and 3 NCAA Division III lacrosse tournament appearances. Along with team success, Cranston showed his individual skill by becoming a 3x Division 3 Lacrosse All-American, a 4x ODAC All-conference selection. He also participated in the senior North-South game.

Professional career

In the 2008 MLL draft, Ryan Cranston was selected in the 4th round as the 32nd overall draft pick by the San Francisco Dragons. Cranston was the first of only three Division 3 lacrosse players selected in the 2008 entry draft.

After playing in the MLL for one season, Ryan Cranston decided to join the LXM PRO lacrosse tour. The LXM pro tour is a league that combines both a lacrosse game with live concert performances. It consists of the 40 top professional lacrosse players to compete against one another on 2 teams.

Care 4 the Cure

Ryan Cranston uses his lacrosse pedigree to give back to the community and help others.  Cranston is the creator and founder of the lacrosse tournament “Care 4 the Cure”. This tournament was created in honor of his sister-in-law, Caroline, who was diagnosed with leukemia in 2008. Cranston wanted to create an event to honor her and help bring awareness to this disease. In 2009, the first “Care 4 the Cure” lacrosse tournament was held, with all proceeds going to the Leukemia and Lymphoma Society. In addition to this a scholarship was created in Caroline’s name.  In its first year, it raised $8,000. Hoping to double donations, Cranston again held the “Care 4 the Cure” lacrosse tournament on November 7, 2010 at West Chester Henderson High School in his hometown of West Chester, Pennsylvania. The tournament proved to be a great success, opening up to 22 high school lacrosse teams from the Philadelphia area. Along with donations to the Leukemia and Lymphoma Society, "Care 4 the Cure" also donated $1,000 to the Be the Match Foundation, a bone marrow registry in 2010.

References

Living people
American lacrosse players
Lynchburg Hornets men's lacrosse players
Year of birth missing (living people)
People from West Chester, Pennsylvania